Rick Law (born December 15, 1969) is an American entertainment illustrator and producer, best known for his career with The Walt Disney Company. His work has spanned across all forms of popular entertainment media: films, TV, music, theme park, print, toys, and video games.

Early life
Law was born in Maryland, and had a turbulent early childhood, before moving at age 11 with his family to Salinas, California, where he attended Salinas High School and graduated a year and 1/2 early.  
As a 15 year old, Law created a t-shirt design that caught the attention of music artist Steve Taylor and won Law a record company promotion. In 1986, at age 16, Law first attended San Diego Comic-Con where he was further inspired by other artists and creators he met there.

Career
Law's first professional job came at age 17, designing logos for a real estate company. Law's previous interaction with Taylor and his record company, eventually led Law to additional opportunities in creating art and working with others in the music industry including Amy Grant, MTV, Arista Records, Tower Records, Mariah Carey, The Choir and Pat Boone.

Law's early efforts at producing included arranging concerts for performer Rich Mullins in Salinas. Law was also a founder and created the original logo art for the Spirit West Coast music festival in Monterey, CA.

Law's initial foray into Hollywood came about during a 1988 trip to Los Angeles with a friend. Seeking a way to sneak into the Paramount Pictures movie studio became a chance encounter with director Richard Donner who allowed Law permission to visit his Scrooged set and access to the studio lot.

In 1989 Law was a consultant for The Arsenio Hall Show. One of his observations on the initial shows' studio audience was to highlight those audience members who had less than optimal seating. The result was the creation of the recurrent "Dog Pound" comedy bit.

Law's first movie poster design was for the 1992 Paramount Pictures film Leap of Faith starring Steve Martin.

In 1995 Law created the supernatural themed black & white comic series Beyond the Veil, both writing and illustrating the series.

In 1996, Law illustrated Pond and Stream : Habitats  for children's educational publisher Evan-Moor.

Law began working with The Walt Disney Company in 1993. Over the course of his diverse career as a content creator with the company he has held a variety of roles. Law created cover art for a number of the studio's video, DVD, & Blu-Ray releases. Some of those include: The Adventures of Ichabod and Mr. Toad; The Lion King II: Simba's Pride; Mulan; The Rescuers Down Under; 101 Dalmatians; Tinker Bell; Piglet's Big Movie; Winnie the Pooh: Springtime with Roo; Tarzan & Jane; Mickey's Once Upon a Christmas, and the first three 'Buddies' films: Air Buddies, Snow Buddies, and Space Buddies. He has been a story contributor; and created or developed a myriad of products for the company and it's licensees. In 2009, Law started designing toys with his reinterpretations of Disney characters via toy manufacturer MINDstyle. In support of the release of Toy Story 3 in Asia, Law was a primary artist for the Alien Invasion Tour, which debuted at Times Square mall in Hong Kong, with artistic reinterpretations of the Toy Story alien character.
Law was a creative lead in the design and launch of Disney English and was a consultant in the development of Shanghai Disneyland Park. As Creative Manager for Disney Learning, his responsibilities involved animation direction and creative oversight of all educational products globally, such as the first series designed for communicatively challenged children. In 2013, he was responsible for the creation of the Disney I Classici collectible trading card set with licensee Conad distributed throughout Italy.

He's been instrumental in fostering projects respective of both animation and the Disney legacy including the documentary Floyd Norman: An Animated Life, and exhibitions  including the Walt Disney Family Museum exhibit: Awaking Beauty: The Art of Eyvind Earle.

As an independent producer, Law was an Associate Producer of the films: Drew: The Man Behind the Poster; Blue Like Jazz; Leonard Knight: A Man & His Mountain; and Executive Producer of the rock album Goliath by Steve Taylor & The Perfect Foil. In 2017, Law created cover artwork for the King Never World War I themed EP All These Things and in 2020 he created cover artwork for the band's single Stick In The Mud.

Law has been a speaker at venues including The Walt Disney Family Museum, CTN Animation Expo, and San Diego Comic-Con. He is a member of the Comic Art Professional Society (CAPS) and has served as a board member of The Society of Illustrators of Los Angeles.

Filmography

Television

Discography

Games

References

External links
 Official website
 
 International Comiclopedia listing for Rick Law

1969 births
Living people
American illustrators
American fantasy writers
Disney people
American male novelists
American film producers